Sahow Metlaq Al-Mutairi (born 17 June 1988) is a Saudi professional footballer who plays for as a striker .

External links

References

1988 births
Living people
Saudi Arabian footballers
Al Batin FC players
Al-Qaisumah FC players
Al-Watani Club players
Saudi First Division League players
Saudi Professional League players
Saudi Second Division players
Saudi Third Division players
Association football forwards